Cheng Fangming (born 28 March 1994) is a Chinese biathlete. He competed in the 2022 Winter Olympics.

Career
Cheng started biathlon in 2011. Cheng won two medals at the 2012 Winter Youth Olympics in the sprint and pursuit events. He was banned for two years in 2016 for doping, taking the diuretic medication hydrochlorothiazide. He competed in multiple biathlon events at the 2022 Winter Olympics. He was part of the Chinese team in the mixed relay, placing 15th out of 20 teams. He placed 69th in the individual event, 32nd in the sprint, 22nd in the pursuit, and 16th with the Chinese team in the men's relay.

References

1994 births
Living people
Biathletes at the 2022 Winter Olympics
Chinese male biathletes
Olympic biathletes of China
Doping cases in biathlon
Chinese sportspeople in doping cases
Biathletes at the 2012 Winter Youth Olympics
Youth Olympic gold medalists for China
Sportspeople from Harbin
21st-century Chinese people